Edgewood Lake was located in Homewood, Alabama, from 1913 until the 1940s when the lake was drained. The lake was formed by damming Shades Creek near Green Springs Highway. Developed as part of the town of Edgewood, the 117-acre (47 ha) lake was the center of a planned auto racing track that was never completed.

References

External links
Edgewood Lake at BhamWiki.com

Lakes of Alabama
Bodies of water of Jefferson County, Alabama
Former lakes of the United States